National Lampoon Sunday Newspaper Parody is an American humor "book", a parody that was first published in 1978 by National Lampoon magazine. In the first printing, this publication had exactly the same form and apparent content as that of an American regional Sunday newspaper, of which it was a parody. The authors of the piece were P. J. O'Rourke and John Hughes.

Physical format
The National Lampoon Sunday Newspaper Parody was originally printed in many different sections, some on the paper stock known as newsprint, and some on other cheap paper, like that used in a real Sunday newspaper of that period.

The (originally separate) sections within the newspaper included: National News, Local News, More Local News, Sports Section, Entertainment, Television Listings, Travel, Real Estate, Gardening, Your Pet, Women's Pages, Classified Ads, a "Swillmart Discount Store" Advertising Supplement, a Parade magazine parody, and eight pages of comics.

The Newspaper Parody was reissued, but in book form, in 2004.

Dacron, Ohio
The newspaper's name is the "Dacron, Ohio Republican–Democrat", a reference to the cities Akron, Ohio and Dayton, Ohio, and to the cheap polyester fabric Dacron. Use of the imaginary city "Dacron, Ohio" links the Newspaper Parody to the National Lampoon 1964 High School Yearbook Parody because  "C. Estes Kefauver High School" was supposedly situated in the same city.

In the newspaper, Dacron is described as "The Motor Home Capital of the World". However, many of the street and location names in the parody actually reference Toledo, Ohio, which was O'Rourke's home town.

1978 books
Sunday Newspaper Parody
Parody books